Obese Records was a record label that released music from the Australian hip hop genre. It was the largest Australian independent hip hop label, including performers Pegz, Thundamentals and Dialectrix.  Obese Records also operated two retail stores in Melbourne, a record distribution company, a soul imprint named Plethora Records, and operates the artists' management and touring company Obese Records Artist Management.

History

Founding as OB's record store
Obese Records was founded in 1995 as a small record store called OB's by Ollie Bobbitt, in the Melbourne suburb of Prahran.   Specialising in hip hop music, the store changed its name to "Obese Records" after Bobbitt sold the business to Shazlek One. In mid-2002 the store was bought by Melbourne-based artist Tirren Staaf (a.k.a. Pegz) who transformed it into a record label.

According to Pegz, there were few other labels specializing in Australian hip hop at the time, and none putting significant funds into marketing. Pegz claims that he "saw the opening and went for it. It was about giving the people around me the opportunity they deserved." Pegz used the label to create a distribution network, and also purchased the Zenith Records vinyl pressing plant, one of only two companies then still pressing vinyl records in Australia. The pressing plant was subsequently sold in November 2007.

Expansion
The first artist released on the label was MC Reason's EP Solid in 2000, produced by Jolz with appearances from Brad Strut, Bias B and Pac D.

Other early releases included compilation albums, Culture of Kings (which included songs by Koolism, Hilltop Hoods, Hunter, Terra Firma, Lyrical Commission and Downsyde) and Obesecity, which Pegz describes as "key networking tools" for the growing Australian hip hop scene, as well as formative releases from Bliss n Eso, Bias B, DJ Bonez, Downsyde, Brad Strut and Layla. The two-disc Culture of Kings Volume Two included tracks by Hilltop Hoods, Delta, Layla, TZU, Hospice, Brothers Stoney, Bliss n Eso and Funkoars. It was the first Australian hip hop album to be selected for the Triple J feature album spot on local radio.

In 2006 the Hilltop Hoods were nominated and won awards for Best Performing Independent Album (The Hard Road) and Best Independent Artist at that year's Australian Independent Record Labels Association (AIR) Chart Awards.

Two artists associated with the label were nominated for four AIR Chart Awards in 2007 (three for Hilltop Hoods and one for Muph & Plutonic). At the 2007 ARIA Awards, the Hilltop Hoods won 'Best Urban Release' for their album The Hard Road: Restrung. The Hilltop Hoods DVD, The City of Light, released by Obese Records in 2007, has also been classified gold. In 2008, two artists on the Obese label, Muph & Plutonic and Spit Syndicate, received nominations for 'Best Urban Album' at the ARIA Awards. In 2010 M-Phazes' album, Good Gracious, was nominated for 'Best Urban Album' at the ARIA Awards.

Recent years
Following Hilltops Hoods departure to start their own label with EMI, Obese Records continued to focus on both established artists and underground locals. Plethora Records was founded as Obese' Records subsidiary soul label in 2010.

Obese was filming episodes for Obese TV, their web series, by 2012. In 2013 Obese Records signed its first management contract with emcee Kerser, at that point having divisions for sales, publicity, marketing, accounts, and A&R. The record store in Prahran at 4A Izett Street continues to sell hip-hop merchandise as of 2013, and also hosts listening parties, radio marathons, and a segment on Obese TV.  Pegz expanded the company in 2013, opening a retail store in the Melbourne neighborhood of Frankston. It stocks music, merchandise, street apparel, spray paint, art supplies, DVDs, and street art magazines.

Periscope Pictures announced on 19 September 2013, that Obese Records would be distributing its documentary Hunter: For The Record locally in Australia. The feature film chronicles hip hop artist Robert Hunter before his death from cancer in 2011. Hunter had released all his albums on Obese, and in conjunction with the DVD, the label is releasing his final album, Bring it All Back, posthumously.

In 2016 Obese Records announced that their official closing date would be 7 May and that they will no longer be releasing any music.

Staff
Tirren StaafCEO
Fern Greig-MooreOperations Manager, Artist Management
Lindsey MartinPublicity, Communications
Lee RawlingsSales, Distribution

Distribution
Obese Records Distribution provides distribution for the following labels, in addition to Obese Records:

The Ayems
Born Fresh
Broken Tooth Entertainment
Crate Cartel
Fat Beats
Karsniogenics
Lookup
Myspherical
Nuff Said Records
Plethora Records
Uknowho Records
WordBurner Entertainment/Bias B

Artists

Bias B (Victoria)
Bliss N Eso (New South Wales)
Brad Strut (Victoria)
Chasm
Coalition Crew (Queensland)
Dialectrix (New South Wales)
DJ Bonez (New South Wales)
Drapht (Western Australia)
Downsyde (Western Australia)
Funkoars (South Australia)
Gully Platoon (Pegz, Dialectrix and Joe New)
Hyjak N Torcha (New South Wales)
Hilltop Hoods (South Australia)
Jase (Victoria)
Kerser (Campbelltown, New South Wales)
Mantra (Victoria)
Matty B (Western Australia)
Layla (Western Australia)
Muph & Plutonic (Victoria)
M-Phazes (Queensland)
Pegz (Victoria)
Plutonic Lab (Victoria)
Reason (Victoria)
Simplex (Adelaide)
Skryptcha (New South Wales)
Spit Syndicate (New South Wales)
Thundamentals (New South Wales)
Vents (South Australia)
7th Wu (New South Wales)

Discography

''Source: Official Discography

See also
 List of independent record labels

References

External links

 
Australian hip hop record labels
Record labels established in 1995